The Green Lane Bridge is a concrete arch bridge over the Schuylkill River and carries Green Lane in Philadelphia. The bridge connects Belmont Hills with Manayunk.

References

See also

 
 
 
 
 List of crossings of the Schuylkill River

Bridges in Philadelphia
Transportation in Montgomery County, Pennsylvania
Northwest Philadelphia
Road bridges in Pennsylvania